Heidi Jo Hoyle-Cleotelis is a major general  in the United States Army. She was the 22nd commanding general of the Military Surface Deployment and Distribution Command, serving from June 23, 2020 to July 20, 2022. She previously served as the 41st chief of ordnance and commandant of the United States Army Ordnance School.

Military education
Hoyle is a native of Bay City, Michigan, and competitive swimmer who graduated from Bay City Central High School in 1990. She was commissioned as an ordnance officer following her graduation from the United States Military Academy at West Point, New York, in 1994. She holds a Bachelor of Science in engineering management, a Master of Science in systems engineering, and a Master of Science in national security and resource strategy.

Military career
Branch detailed to the Chemical Corps, Hoyle attended the Basic Course at Fort McClellan, Alabama, and then moved to Hanau, Germany, for her first assignment as the battalion chemical officer in 7–227th Aviation Regiment. After a quick transition course at Redstone Arsenal, Alabama, she served as accountable officer, then shop officer, in the 71st Ordnance Company before serving as the maintenance support operations officer of the 18th Corps Support Battalion. Following the Combined Logistics Officer Advanced Course and Explosive Ordnance Disposal (EOD) School, she commanded the 761st Ordnance Company (EOD) and also served as the battalion operations officer (S-3) of the 19th Maintenance Battalion at Fort Sill, Oklahoma.

Upon graduation from the University of Virginia in 2004, she was assigned as an instructor, then associate professor, in the Department of Systems Engineering at West Point, New York. Her next assignment was at Fort Carson, Colorado, where she served as the 242nd Ordnance Battalion (EOD) executive officer with deployment to Afghanistan in support of Operation Enduring Freedom. She was then assigned to serve as the aide-de-camp to the director of the Joint Improvised Explosive Device (IED) Defeat Organization. In 2010, she was selected for command of the Special Troops Battalion (STB) of the 3rd Sustainment Brigade, Fort Stewart, Georgia and deployed in support of the Iraq War.

In 2013, Hoyle attended Senior Service College at the Dwight D. Eisenhower School for National Security and Resource Strategy at Fort McNair, Washington, D.C. She then served as deputy chief of staff for prevention programs in 4th ID prior to commanding the 71st EOD Group at Fort Carson, Colorado. Following her command of the 71st EOD Group, she was assigned as the executive officer to the Executive Deputy of Army Materiel Command at Redstone Arsenal, Alabama. Later, she served as commanding general, Joint Munitions Command and Joint Munitions and Lethality Life Cycle Management Command, Rock Island Arsenal, Illinois. She served as the 41st Chief of Ordnance from 2018 to 2020.

In February 2022, Hoyle was reassigned as the director of operations (G-43/5/7) of the Office of the Deputy Chief of Staff for Logistics.

In January 2023, Hoyle was nominated for promotion to lieutenant general.

Awards and decorations

Personal
Hoyle is the daughter of Michael and Edie Hoyle. She is married to Demetrious Cleotelis.

References

Year of birth missing (living people)
Living people
21st-century American women
People from Bay City, Michigan
United States Military Academy alumni
University of Virginia School of Engineering and Applied Science alumni
United States Military Academy faculty
Dwight D. Eisenhower School for National Security and Resource Strategy alumni
Female generals of the United States Army
Logistics personnel of the United States military
United States Army personnel of the War in Afghanistan (2001–2021)
United States Army personnel of the Iraq War
Recipients of the Legion of Merit